Mario Prassinos (30 July 1916 – 23 October 1985) was a French modernist painter, printmaker, illustrator, stage designer, and writer of Greek-Italian descent.

Life and work
Prassinos was born in Constantinople, Ottoman Empire (now Turkey) in 1916, the son of Victorine and Lysandre Prassinos. In 1922, at the age of six, he immigrated to France with his family, who had escaped the brutal persecution of Greeks and other ethnic minorities by the Ottoman government. Prassinos became a naturalized French citizen in 1949.

He attended the Sorbonne in Paris beginning in 1932 and briefly trained in the studio of the French painter Clement Serveau (1886–1972).

Through his father's literary interests Prassinos became acquainted with Surrealism, meeting Paul Eluard, André Breton, Salvador Dalí, Man Ray. Max Ernst, Marcel Duchamp and others in 1934, and decided to become an artist. From 1932 to 1936 he worked in a Surrealist style, introducing procedures of automatism and formal ambiguities that he retained in his later work.

His first exhibition took place in 1938 at the Galerie Billiet-Pierre Vorms in Paris. That same year he married Yolande Borelly (1915-2015). His daughter Catherine Prassinos was born in 1946.

Prassinos volunteered for military service in 1940, was seriously wounded and later received the Croix de Guerre (Cross of War). He also worked with the French Resistance during World War II, helping Allied soldiers escape Nazi-occupied France.

During the period 1942 to 1950 he met Raymond Queneau and Albert Camus and produced work for Editions Gallimard.

Prassinos' work is found in major art museums in Europe and North America, including the Stedelijk Museum, Amsterdam; Musée National d'Art Moderne, Paris; Kunsthalle Bremen, Germany; Victoria and Albert Museum, London; Museum of Modern Art, New York; Metropolitan Museum of Art, New York; Art Institute of Chicago, and others.

Prassinos died at his home in Eygalières, France, on 23 October 1985. After his death, a donation of 800 of the artist's works was made to the French state. The "Donation Mario Prassinos" collection is housed in the Chapel of Notre-Dame de Pitié (also called Notre-Dame des Sept Douleurs) in Saint Remy de Provence, France.

His sister Gisèle Prassinos (1920-2015) is a noted surrealist writer.

Solo exhibitions
 1938 Galerie Billiet-Pierre Vorms, Paris
 1944 Galerie de la Pleiade N.R.F., Paris
 1948 Galerie Billiet-Caputo, Paris
 1950 Perspectives Gallery, New York
 1952 Galerie Apollo, Brussels
 1953 Galerie de France, Paris (and 1955, 1957, 1960, 1964, 1966, 1972, 1976)
 1956 Galerie la Demeure, Paris (and 1961, 1963, 1964, 1966, 1968, 1971, 1974)
 1958 Galleria Blu, Milan
 1960 Auckland City Art Gallery, Auckland, New Zealand
 1961 Haaken Gallery, Oslo; Chateau Grimaldi, Antibes, France
 1962 Galerie Spinazzola, Aix-en-Provence, France
 1963 Arnhem Museum of Modern Art, Arnheim, Netherlands; Haarlem Museum, Haarlem, Netherlands
 1963 La Chaux-de-Fonds Museum, La Chaux-de-Fonds, Switzerland 
 1964 Colette Ryter Gallery, Zurich (and 1967, 1971, 1973)
 1965 New Museum of Fine Arts, Le Havre, France
 1966 Merlin Gallery, Athens
 1968 Cantini Museum, Marseilles, France
 1970 Chicago Arts Club, Chicago
 1970 Musée Réattu, Arles, France 
 1971 Galerie Noella Gest, Saint-Remy-de-Provence, France
 1972 Ateneo, Madrid
 1973 Athens Art Gallery, Athens (and 1978)
 1974 Le Couvent Royal de Saint Maximin, Fondation Royaumont, Abbaye de Senanque, Abbaye de Montmajour, Arles, France
 1979 French Institute, Athens
 1980 Galeries Nationales du Grand Palais, Paris
 1983 Presence Contemporaine, Aix-en-Provence, France
 1984 Le Musee Departemental de la Tapisserie, Aubusson, France; French Institute, Athens; Grand Magister Palace, Rhodes, Greece; Museum of Contemporary Art, Thessaloniki, Greece; Medusa Art Gallery, Athens (and 2007)
 1986 Inauguration of the donation of Mario Prassinos to the French State, and then annual exhibitions, Saint-Remy-de-Provence, France
 1987 OMAC, La Malmaison, Cannes, France
 1988 Musee des Beaux-Arts d'Ixelles, Brussels; Musee Jean-Lurcat et de la tapisserie contemporaine, Angers, France
 1989 Galerie Inard, Paris
 1991 Pavillon des Arts, Paris
 1991 Titanium Gallery, Athens
 1995 Galerie Thessa Herold, Paris (and 1997)
 1996 Espace 13, Aix-en-Provence, France
 1998 Musee Toulouse-Lautrec, Albi, France
 1998 Musee de l'Hospice Saint-Roch, Issoudun, France
 1999 Musée Réattu, Arles, France
 2000 Galerie Etats d'Art, Paris (and 2005)
 2001 Kydonieos Foundation, Andros, Greece
 2005 Galerie Andre Dimanche, Marseilles, France
 2006 Galerie La Hune-Brenner, Paris
 2009 Chapelle des penitents noirs, Aubagne, France
 2011 Medusa Art Gallery, Athens

Notes

References 
 Prassinos, Arbres et bouquets, préface de Myriam Prévot, Galerie de France, Paris, 1960.
 Jean-Louis Ferrier, Prassinos, Le Musée de Poche, Paris, Éditions Georges Fall, 1962.
 Mario Prassinos, peintures et dessins récents, textes de Mario Prassinos, Raymond Queneau, François Nourissier, René Char, Albert Camus, Marc Alyn, Jean-Louis Ferrier, Pierre Seghers, Jean Boissieu, Jean-Jacques Lévêque, Jean Lescure, Pierre Cabanne, Gisèle Prassinos et Pierre Emmanuel, Paris, Galerie Nationale du Grand Palais, 1980.
 Prassinos, textes de Jean-Louis Ferrier, Gisèle Prassinos et Mario Prassinos, entretien avec Mario Prassinos, Aix-en-Provence, Présence contemporaine, 1983, 144 p..
 Mario Prassinos, Levallois-Perret, Les amis de Valentin Brû [Raymond Queneau], n° 28–29, 1984 [Raymond Queneau et Mario Prassinos].
 Hélène Parmelin, Les Peintres de Jean Vilar : Calder, Chastel, Gischia, Jacno, Lagrange, Manessier, Pignon, Prassinos et Singier, Fondation Jean Vilar, Avignon, 1984.
 La donation Mario Prassinos (catalogue raisonné), Catherine Prassinos et Thierry Rye, préface de Pierre Cabanne, Saint-Rémy de Provence, FMP Donation Mario Prassinos, 1990, 158 p..
 Lydia Harambourg, Mario Prassinos, dans L'École de Paris 1945–1965, Dictionnaire des peintres, Neuchâtel, Ides et Calendes, 1993,.
 Correspondance d'Henri Parisot avec Mario et Gisèle Prassinos, 1933–1938, Prassinos Catherine, Rye Thierry (éd.), Joelle Losfeld, 2003, 212 p..
 Monographie Mario Prassinos, peinture et dessin, préface de François Nourissier, Catherine Prassinos (expert de l'Union Française des Experts, UFE) et Thierry Rye (éd.), Actes Sud, 2005, 342 p..

External links
 Mario Prassinos official website

1916 births
1985 deaths
Greek emigrants to France
Modern artists
French surrealist artists
Greek surrealist artists
French abstract artists
Greek scenic designers
French scenic designers
20th-century French painters
20th-century French male artists
French male painters
French illustrators
French people of Greek descent
20th-century French sculptors
French male sculptors
20th-century French printmakers
Constantinopolitan Greeks
Artists from Istanbul